Douglas Andrey López Araya (born 21 September 1998) is a Costa Rican professional footballer for C.S. Herediano in Liga FPD, the Costa Rican top division, and the Costa Rica national football team.

Career
López made his debut for Santos de Guapileson 22 July 2018 against Deportivo Saprissa. On 5 September 2018 he scored his first goal as a professional, against Municipal de Pérez Zeledón. In October 2021 it was revealed he had agreed to join C.S. Herediano at the end of his contract. In June 2022 López officially joined C.S. Herediano from Santos de Guapiles, signing a contract until 2025.

International career
López made his debut as a full Costa Rican international on 30 March 2022 in the final qualifying match for the World Cup against the United States, playing the last twenty-two minutes of the 2-0 victory. López was named in the Costa Rica national football team squad for the 2022 FIFA World Cup.

References

External links
 

1998 births
Living people
Costa Rican footballers
Association football defenders
Santos de Guápiles footballers
C.S. Herediano footballers
Liga FPD players
Costa Rica international footballers
People from Alajuela
2022 FIFA World Cup players